Somethin' for the People was a contemporary R&B group from Oakland, California, who scored several hits in the US in the late 1990s.

History
The group was founded in 1990 by Curtis "Sauce" Wilson and Jeff "Fuzzy" Young, both from Oakland, California, along with Los Angeles native Rochad "Cat Daddy" Holiday. The group recorded demos and shopped them around Los Angeles, and signed with Capitol Records, who released their debut in 1993. The song 'Take it Easy', which was first written for SWV was covered by R&B singer Joyce Wrice 20 years later. As songwriters, they wrote tunes for Samuelle, En Vogue, Brandy, and U.N.V. Switching to Warner Bros. Records, they re-released their debut album in 1996. Their second album, This Time It's Personal, spawned a major hit in the US and Canada, the platinum-selling "My Love Is the Shhh!", which reached #4 in the US and #7 in Canada, and the group did further work as songwriters in the wake of the tune's success, penning tracks for Will Smith and Adina Howard. A third LP, Issues, followed in July 2000.

Band member Jeff “Fuzzy” Young died on March 4, 2011, from an apparent heart attack.

Discography

Singles

References

Musical groups from Los Angeles
American rhythm and blues musical groups
Musical groups established in 1990